Mount Royal University (MRU) is a public university in Calgary, Alberta, Canada.

History
Mount Royal University was founded by Alberta provincial charter by the Arthur Sifton government on December 16, 1910 and officially opened on September 8, 1911. Originally "Mount Royal College", the institution was the brainchild of Calgary Reverend George W. Kerby (1860-1944) who sought an opportunity for higher education for the benefit of young people from rural homes in the area. The provincial charter as presented in the legislature by R. B. Bennett was titled "Bill 48, An Act respecting the Calgary College", however Premier Sifton, Kerby and others agreed not to use Calgary for the name of the new college.

Mount Royal became a post-secondary institution in 1931 as Mount Royal Junior College (MRC) offering transfer courses to the University of Alberta and later to the University of Calgary. In 1972 Mount Royal moved from several buildings in downtown Calgary to a new campus in Lincoln Park on land previously used as an air force base. A war memorial honour roll is dedicated to Mount Royal alumni who have volunteered for active service in the Canadian Forces.

Mount Royal University was granted university status in 2009 by the provincial government. The university currently offers 12 degrees and 32 majors with an average class size of 29 students.

In 2017, Mount Royal University was awarded the Ashoka Changemaker Campus designation joining 44 universities which are leading higher education in the area of social innovation and changemaking.

Academics

Faculties

 Faculty of Arts
Economics, Justice, and Policy Studies
English, Languages, and Cultures
Humanities
Interior Design
Psychology
Sociology and Anthropology
 Bissett School of Business
 Accounting
 Aviation
 Finance
 General Management
 Human Resources
 Innovation & Entrepreneurship
 International Business
 Marketing
 Social Innovation
 Supply Chain Management
 School of Communication Studies
 Broadcast Media Studies
 Information Design
 Journalism
 Public Relations
 Faculty of Health, Community and Education
 Child Studies and Social Work
 Education
 Health and Physical Education
 School of Nursing and Midwifery
 Faculty of Science and Technology
 Biology
 Chemistry and Physics
 Earth and Environmental Sciences
 Mathematics and Computing
 Faculty of Continuing Education and Extension

Institutes

 Institute for Community Prosperity
 Institute for Environmental Sustainability
 Institute for Innovation and Entrepreneurship
 Institute for Scholarship of Teaching and Learning
 International Education

Centres
 Centre for Community Disaster Research
 Iniskim Centre

Studios
 Trico Changemakers Studio

Performing Arts Centre

In July 2015, the $90.5 million Taylor Centre for the Performing Arts (TCPA) was officially opened, accommodating the growing Mount Royal Conservatory, which is a musical conservatoire in operation since 1910 that serves up to 10,000 Calgarians annually. In addition to 43 soundproof rehearsal studios and 6 ensemble suites, the TCPA also houses the 787-seat Bella Concert Hall (opened August 26, 2015), which was designed by Pfeiffer Partners Architects in cooperation with Sahuri + Partners who used a "contemporary interpretation of the rural barn on the expansive prairie of Alberta" in their design. The Taylor Centre for the Performing Arts is named after the family name of businessman, philanthropist, and Calgarian Don Taylor who donated $21-million to the project. Additionally, the namesake of the Bella Concert Hall is Mary Belle Taylor, Don Taylor's mother, who was affectionately known as 'Bella.'  In addition to its design, the Taylor Centre for the Performing Arts is notable for being a LEED Gold certified building and for being highly accessible for users with diverse physical abilities. While built with the needs of the Mount Royal Conservatory in mind, the TCPA and its various spaces are considered a community resource.

Library

Mount Royal University officially opened the Riddell Library and Learning Centre on September 7, 2017 replacing the previous library which opened in 1972. The Riddell Library is named after Calgary businessman Clay Riddell who contributed a sizeable donation to the project. The $100 million dollar facility features more than 16,000-square-metres of space, 34 study rooms, 1,700 seats, access to 3D printing, and even a cafe.

Athletics
The Mount Royal University athletic nickname is the Cougars. The Cougars made the transition to the top level of amateur athletics in Canada for the 2012–13 season, moving to the Canada West conference of Canadian Interuniversity Sport (since re-named U Sports). The university supports eight teams competing in men’s and women’s basketball, hockey, soccer and volleyball.

Notable alumni 
Notable alumni of the university include:
 Doris Anderson (1939); powerful force for change and women’s rights as editor of Chatelaine magazine from 1957 to 1977. She continued her advocacy efforts as Chair of the Advisory Council on the Status of Women, President of the National Action Committee on the Status of Women and President of Fair Vote Canada.
 Paul Brandt (Nursing, 1992); most awarded male country musician in Canadian history. He was a pediatric nurse in 1996 when the release of his first single My Heart Has a History, propelled him to international musical success.
Leslie Feist (Mount Royal Conservatory); Juno award-winning indie pop artist.
 John de Chastelain; Canadian soldier and diplomat who heads the Independent International Commission on Decommissioning.
 Marie Clements (Journalism); Métis playwright, performer, and director
 Chris Gailus (Journalism, 1989); Emmy Award-winning news anchor. After leaving Calgary in 2000, he worked in Dallas and then New York before joining the Global BC team in Vancouver as weekend anchor.
 Bret Hart; professional wrestler.
 Kent Hehr; former Alberta MLA, member of parliament and Minister of Veterans Affairs.
 Norman Kwong (Commercial, 1949); former CFL player and was installed as Alberta’s 15th Lieutenant Governor on Jan. 20, 2005. He was the first person of Chinese heritage to serve in either profession.
 Alvin Law; motivational speaker.
 Bruce McCulloch (Public Relations); successful director, writer, actor and comedian who has won several Gemini Awards and received multiple Emmy Award nominations. He is best known for his work as a member of The Kids in the Hall and as a writer for Saturday Night Live.
 Kirby Morrow; professional voice actor.
 Dave Pierce; Emmy-winning composer.
 Alison Redford; Premier of Alberta from 2011 to 2014.
 Kavan Smith; Canadian actor.
 Harnarayan Singh; Play-by-play commentator for Sportsnet (Hockey Night in Canada, Hockey Night in Punjabi)
 Yuja Wang; classical pianist.
 The PropheC; Indo-Canadian singer

Arms

References

Further reading

External links

 Mount Royal University
 Students' Association of Mount Royal University
 Mount Royal Staff Association
 Mount Royal Faculty Association
 Taylor Centre for the Performing Arts
 The Reflector - Mount Royal's Independent Student Newspaper
 CMRU Radio

 
Universities and colleges in Calgary
Universities in Alberta
Educational institutions established in 1910
1910 establishments in Alberta
Distance education institutions based in Canada